Deceiver of the Gods is the ninth studio album by Swedish melodic death metal band Amon Amarth. It was released in Sweden and Finland on 19 June 2013, and in the US on 25 June 2013 through Metal Blade Records and Sony Music. Former Candlemass singer Messiah Marcolin makes a guest appearance on the track "Hel".

The title of the album and its artwork were revealed on 12 April 2013, and the title song was released on the band's homepage a day later, available for streaming or as a free download. A video for the song was released in September 2014.

In Canada, the album debuted at number 9 on the Canadian Albums Chart. This was the band's last album with longtime drummer Fredrik Andersson before he left the band in March 2015.

Reception 

According to Metacritic, the album received "generally favorable reviews based on 7 critics", with an aggregate score of 67 out of 100.  Allmusic praised the album for balancing "unyielding blasts of Viking brutality" with "artful melodies" while Exclaim.ca similarly awarded a favorable score for the band's mixture of "soaring melodies" with the "raw precision" of the rhythms.  However, Pitchfork criticized the album as formulaic and uninspired while About.com described the album as a "letdown" due to Amon Amarth's "playing it safe" approach.  This view was contrary to that expressed in Decibel Magazine, where the album was praised for duelling guitars invoking Thin Lizzy, Iron Maiden, and Judas Priest while the "expertly woven ebb and flow of tempo and style" caused the album to go "from rampaging to brooding to anthemic over a well-conceived trajectory." Tony Vilgotsky of Russian magazine Mir Fantastiki have rated this album with 7 of 10, saying that Deceiver of the Gods slightly doesn't reach the level of previous Amon Amarth's work, Surtur Rising, but this doesn't spoil the overall impression of the record.

Track listing

Personnel 
Amon Amarth
 Olavi Mikkonen − lead guitar
 Johan Hegg − vocals
 Ted Lundström − bass
 Johan Söderberg − rhythm guitar
 Fredrik Andersson − drums

Additional musicians
 Messiah Marcolin (ex-Candlemass) − guest vocals on "Hel"

Production
 Andy Sneap − production, mixing, mastering
 Tom Thiel − artwork

Charts

References

Amon Amarth albums
Metal Blade Records albums
2013 albums
Albums produced by Andy Sneap